The Terang Mortlake Football Netball Club, nicknamed the Bloods, is an Australian rules football and netball club based in the Victorian towns of Terang and Mortlake. The club teams currently compete in the Hampden Football Netball League.

The club is the result of an amalgamation of two of the founding clubs of the league –Terang FC and Mortlake FC– in 2001. Terang Mortlake debuted in the league in 2002.

Football Premierships
Hampden Football League
Seniors
 (3): 2004, 2005, 2008

Football League - Best & Fairest 
Hampden Football League
Seniors - Maskell Medal
 2004: Luke Vogels
 2002: David Ryan

Reserves

Notable players
Luke Vogels -  Sydney Swans
Chris Heffernan (Essendon FC, Melbourne FC)
Jordie McKenzie (Melbourne FC)
Luke Rounds 
Lewis Taylor 
Alan McConnell (Footscray)
Ron Wearmouth (Collingwood)
Ian Payne (Essendon)
Charlie Payne (Essendon)
Daryl Griffith (St Kilda)
Dick Wearmouth (Footscray)
 Justin Morrison (Greater Western Sydney)

References

External links
 Facebook page
 SportsTG site

2001 establishments in Australia
Sports clubs established in 2001
Australian rules football clubs established in 2001
Hampden Football League clubs
Netball teams in Victoria (Australia)